The 1983–84 Superliga Espanola de Hockey Hielo season was the 12th season of the Superliga Espanola de Hockey Hielo, the top level of ice hockey in Spain. Four teams participated in the league, and CH Jaca won the championship.

First round

Final round

External links
Season on hockeyarchives.info

Spain
Liga Nacional de Hockey Hielo seasons
Liga